The 1976 Delaware gubernatorial election was held on November 2, 1976. Republican nominee Pete du Pont defeated incumbent Democratic Governor Sherman W. Tribbitt with 56.86% of the vote.

Nominations
From 1972 to 1992 Delaware used a system of “challenge” primaries, in which a candidate for statewide office who received at least 35 percent of the convention vote could challenge the endorsed candidate in a primary. No such primaries were held in 1976.

General election

Candidates
Sherman W. Tribbitt, Democratic, incumbent Governor
Pete du Pont, Republican, U.S. Representative for Delaware's at-large congressional district
George W. Cripps, American, former Delaware Auditor of Accounts
Harry Conner, Prohibition

Results

References

Bibliography
 
 
 
 

1976
Delaware
Gubernatorial
November 1976 events in the United States